Antoni Gościański (21 February 1926 – 25 March 1998) was a Polish boxer. He competed in the men's heavyweight event at the 1952 Summer Olympics.

References

1926 births
1998 deaths
Polish male boxers
Olympic boxers of Poland
Boxers at the 1952 Summer Olympics
People from Gostyń County
Heavyweight boxers
20th-century Polish people